French Exit is a 1995 American romantic comedy film directed by Daphna Kastner and starring Mädchen Amick and Jonathan Silverman. It is Kastner's directorial debut.

Plot
Davis meets Zina in a car wreck. Their immediate attraction for one another is put into jeopardy when they learn each is competing for the same writing job.

Cast
Mädchen Amick as Zina
Jonathan Silverman as Davis
Molly Hagan as Alice
Vince Grant as Charles
Kurt Fuller as Stubin
Beth Broderick as Andie Ross
Bruce Nozick as Seller
Craig Vincent as Frank
Steven Brill as Ben
Cecilia Peck as Airline Ticket Agent
Rebecca Broussard as Green Sweater Bimbette

References

External links
 
 

1995 films
American romantic comedy films
1995 directorial debut films
1990s English-language films
1990s American films
1995 romantic comedy films